Gyi Khin Pe (born 9 July 1916) was a Burmese sailor. He competed at the 1956 Summer Olympics and the 1960 Summer Olympics.

References

External links
 

1916 births
Year of death missing
Burmese male sailors (sport)
Olympic sailors of Myanmar
Sailors at the 1956 Summer Olympics – 12 m2 Sharpie
Sailors at the 1960 Summer Olympics – Flying Dutchman
Place of birth missing